The Tarlac River is a river in Central Luzon Philippines, it is the longest tributary of the Agno River with a total length of   covering a drainage area of  traversing the provinces of Tarlac and Pangasinan. The river originates around the vicinity of Mount Pinatubo and empties itself into the Agno River at Poponto Swamp located between the boundaries of Tarlac and Pangasinan. Its main tributary is the O'Donnel River in Santa Lucia, Capas, Tarlac.

The Tarlac River is dammed at Barangay Tibag in Tarlac City where its water is used for irrigation and distributed to the northern and central regions of Tarlac, the rest of the river is now a bed of sand. The river was once a good source of fish and water used for irrigation, the irrigation system now takes just about "all" of the remaining water and distributes it to barangays in Tarlac City such as Matatalaib and Maliwalo. The river bed is also being used as a source of sand and stones that can be used as construction materials.

References

Rivers of the Philippines
Landforms of Tarlac